Robert Ramsay may refer to:

 Robert Ramsay (principal) (1598-1651) Principal of Glasgow University
 Robert Ramsay (Jacobite) (died 1689), Scottish military officer killed at the Siege of Derry
 Robert Ramsay (Victorian politician) (1842–1882), Australian statesman
 Robert Ramsay (Queensland politician) (1818–1910), Queensland politician
 Robert Ramsay (baseball) (1973–2016), pitcher for the Seattle Mariners
 Bob Ramsay (footballer) (1864–?), English footballer
 Robert B. Ramsay, Royal Navy officer and chief of staff Nore Command 
 Robert L. Ramsay (academic) (1880–1953), American toponymist
 Robert L. Ramsay (politician) (1877–1956), American politician
 Robert Ramsay (cricketer) (1861–1957), cricketer for Cambridge University and Somerset

See also
 Robert George Wardlaw-Ramsay (1852–1921), British Army officer and ornithologist
 Robert Ramsey (disambiguation)